James McDonnell is the former sheriff of Los Angeles County. McDonnell was elected as L.A. County's 32nd sheriff on November 4, 2014, defeating former Undersheriff Paul Tanaka (who is now in federal prison). He replaced interim sheriff John Scott on December 1, 2014. Scott replaced former sheriff Lee Baca (who is also in federal prison). Previously, McDonnell served as the Chief of Police in Long Beach, California and before that in the Los Angeles Police Department. McDonnell was defeated in 2018 by Alex Villanueva.

Early life and education
McDonnell grew up in a working-class neighborhood in Brookline, Massachusetts. He graduated from Saint Anselm College in Goffstown, New Hampshire, where he received a Bachelor of Science in Criminal Justice. He then received a master's degree in Public Administration from the University of Southern California.

Career

LAPD
McDonnell began his law enforcement career as twenty-one-year-old graduate from the Los Angeles Police Academy in 1981. During his 28 years of work in the LAPD, he held every rank except Chief of Police and served as second in command to Chief William Bratton. He was considered a frontrunner for the position but Charlie Beck was appointed instead of him. While at the LAPD McDonnell was viewed as an ambassador who helped the department connect with Los Angeles' diverse communities and political leaders as Bratton's chief of staff and second-in-command. As a candidate for Chief in 2002, McDonnell presented a plan for community-based policing that was eventually adopted by Bratton and served as the foundation to overhaul and reform the LAPD. While working for the LAPD, he held a variety of assignments in patrol, detectives, vice, gang, organized crime, homicide and other divisions. In the 1990s as a commander, he gained attention for his efforts to revitalize the LAPD's senior lead officer program and to build the LAPD forerunner to the Compstat computer crime-mapping system along with helping implement the consent decree.

LBPD
After losing the LAPD Chief's job to Charlie Beck, McDonnell in March 2010 was appointed as the police chief of Long Beach, California, replacing former Chief Anthony Batts, who left to become the chief of the Oakland Police Department. This occurred over objections by some in the department who preferred a chief from within the Long Beach Police Department and, indeed, a career LBPD officer would succeed McDonnell. As police chief, McDonnell oversaw a large increase in officer-involved shootings and a 20% decrease in sworn officers from 1,000 to 800. Violent crime also fell during McDonnell's tenure and he has received credit for improving community relations with the police, reducing gang activity, and trying to improve racial diversity in the department. After McDonnell's election on November 4, 2014, Deputy Chief Robert Luna was selected to replace him to become the 26th Police Chief of Long Beach. Luna was considered a frontrunner for the position before McDonnell was appointed and became the department's first Latino police chief.

LASD
McDonnell expressed support for a civilian oversight commission to supplement the new inspector general in monitoring the department but has stated that he is still evaluating whether the inspector general should have subpoena power and access to personnel records. He was sworn in on December 1, 2014, and became the first person from outside of the sheriff's department to be elected to the office of Sheriff in over 100 years. His attempt at reelection was rejected by the voters in 2018. He was succeeded by Alex Villanueva.

November 2014

Dates of rank

Personal life
McDonnell is married to Kathy McDonnell. They have two daughters.

References

External links 
 Campaign website

Los Angeles County, California sheriffs
Law enforcement workers from California
American municipal police chiefs
1959 births
Living people
People from Boston
People from Long Beach, California
People from Los Angeles
Saint Anselm College alumni
USC Sol Price School of Public Policy alumni
Los Angeles Police Department officers